This is a list of rulers of Bassein (Pathein), one of the three main Mon-speaking provinces of Lower Burma. (now Myanmar).

Pagan period

Hanthawaddy period

Toungoo period

Konbaung period

See also
 Hanthawaddy Kingdom
 List of Burmese monarchs
 List of rulers of Pegu
 List of rulers of Martaban

Notes

References

Bibliography
 

Bassein
Hanthawaddy dynasty